Huttig is a city in Union County, Arkansas, United States. The population was 597 at the 2010 census.

Geography
Huttig is located at  (33.038999, -92.183797).

Demographics

As of the census of 2000, there were 731 people, 282 households, and 197 families residing in the city. The racial makeup of the city was 48.70% White, 48.43% Black or African American, 0.82% Native American, 0.14% Pacific Islander, 0.82% from other races, and 1.09% from two or more races.  1.50% of the population were Hispanic or Latino of any race.

There were 282 households, out of which 32.6% had children under the age of 18 living with them, 50.4% were married couples living together, 16.7% had a female householder with no husband present, and 29.8% were non-families. 28.0% of all households were made up of individuals, and 12.4% had someone living alone who was 65 years of age or older.  The average household size was 2.59 and the average family size was 3.22.

In the city, the population was spread out, with 25.9% under the age of 18, 8.9% from 18 to 24, 29.4% from 25 to 44, 22.7% from 45 to 64, and 13.1% who were 65 years of age or older.  The median age was 36 years. For every 100 females, there were 96.0 males.  For every 100 females age 18 and over, there were 88.9 males.

The median income for a household in the city was $25,284, and the median income for a family was $32,000. Males had a median income of $31,375 versus $18,056 for females. The per capita income for the city was $12,215.  About 16.1% of families and 16.2% of the population were below the poverty line, including 23.1% of those under age 18 and 11.3% of those age 65 or over.

Education 
Public education for elementary and secondary school students is provided by the Strong–Huttig School District, which leads to graduation from Strong High School.

It was served by Huttig School District, which operated Huttig Elementary School and Huttig High School. On July 1, 2004, it consolidated with the Strong School District to form the Strong-Huttig School District.

Notable people
 Daisy Bates—civil rights activist
 Floyd Cramer—American Hall of Fame pianist
 Barbara Jean Bolton - Hall of Fame grandmother, known to those who loved her as "Yang-Ya". Grandmother to nine grandchildren as well as their spouses.  Great-Grandmother to twenty great-grandchildren. Great-Great Grandmother to one great-great grandchild.

References

Cities in Arkansas
Cities in Union County, Arkansas